Pabilgagaltuku, also Pabilgeshgaltuku (pa.bil2.ĝeš-gal-tuku) was Governor (ensi) of Umma, a city-state in Sumer, circa 2450 BCE.  He was captured by Ur-Nanshe of Lagash. His successor was Ush, king of Umma.

Pabilgagaltuku is known from an inscription of Ur-Nanshe, in which Ur-Nanshe claims that he defeated Umma and captured Pabilgagaltuku:  

Pabilgagaltuku may also be mentioned in the Stele of Vultures, as having been vanquished in the past by Ur-Nanshe.

See also
 List of Mesopotamian dynasties

References

Kings of Umma
25th-century BC Sumerian kings